Fortuna is a census-designated place in western Moniteau County, Missouri, United States.

A post office called Fortuna has been in operation since 1882. The community was named after Fortuna, the Roman goddess of fortune.

Demographics

References

Unincorporated communities in Moniteau County, Missouri
Jefferson City metropolitan area
Unincorporated communities in Missouri